William Sparkman Overstreet (born October 7, 1979) is a former American football linebacker for the Atlanta Falcons in the National Football League. He was drafted by the Falcons in the third round of the 2002 NFL Draft out of the University of Tennessee where he was a captain on the 2001 Tennessee team. He was a member of Pi Kappa Alpha fraternity.  He played high school football at Jackson (Miss.) Prep. Prior to signing with the Vols in February 1998, the Clarion-Ledger newspaper named Overstreet the 1997 Metro-Jackson Area Player of the Year and selected him as a member of their All-State team.

Overstreet retired from the NFL after continued shoulder injuries. He graduated with his M.B.A. in Finance in December 2006.  He was the founder and CEO of a software company headquartered in Knoxville, TN, called Voices Heard Media, Inc.

References

External links
NFL.com Player Page
College Info
Pro stats
Voices Heard Media

1979 births
Living people
Players of American football from Jackson, Mississippi
American football linebackers
American football defensive ends
Tennessee Volunteers football players
Atlanta Falcons players